Walker Dwain Zimmerman (born May 19, 1993) is an American professional soccer player who plays as a center-back for Major League Soccer club Nashville SC and the United States national team.

A native of Lawrenceville, Georgia, Zimmerman played two seasons in college with the Furman Paladins before signing a Generation Adidas deal with Major League Soccer. He was then selected in the 2013 MLS SuperDraft by FC Dallas as the 7th overall pick. Initially struggling for playtime due to injuries, Zimmerman established himself as a regular starter in 2016. He started in 38 matches as FC Dallas completed the double, winning the Supporters' Shield and the U.S. Open Cup. In December 2017, Zimmerman was traded to expansion side Los Angeles FC, helping the club win the Supporters' Shield in 2019. He was also selected for the MLS All-Star team and MLS Best XI. Zimmerman was then traded to another expansion side, Nashville SC, in February 2020. With Nashville SC, he won back-to-back Defender of the Year awards in 2020 and 2021.

Zimmerman made his debut for the United States in January 2017 against Jamaica. In 2019, he was selected into the squad that finished runners-up in the CONCACAF Gold Cup. He was also a member of the squad that won the tournament in 2021, starting all three group stage matches before having to leave the tournament due to a hamstring injury.

Club career

Youth and college
Zimmerman came through the youth academy at Gwinnett Soccer Association in Lilburn, Georgia, where he was mentored by former Atlanta Silverbacks and Charleston Battery manager Nuno Piteira. Zimmerman also went to Brookwood High School and played soccer there. He was coached by Daniel Klinect.

Zimmerman played college soccer at Furman University between 2011 and 2012. He was named First Team All-Conference 2011, Southern Conference Freshman of the Year 2011, and National Soccer Coaches Association of America NCAA Division I Men's All-America Second Team in 2012.

Professional
FC Dallas selected Zimmerman in the first round (No. 7 overall) of the 2013 MLS SuperDraft. He made his professional debut on May 11, 2013, as a late substitute in a 2–1 victory against D.C. United.

On December 10, 2017, Zimmerman was traded by FC Dallas to new expansion side Los Angeles FC in exchange for $250,000 in General Allocation Money and $250,000 in Targeted Allocation Money. The two clubs also swapped allocation rankings with FC Dallas moving to #1 and Los Angeles FC moving to #11. During the 2019 season, Zimmerman was also an assistant coach for the UCLA Bruins men's soccer program.

On February 11, 2020, Zimmerman was traded to Major League Soccer expansion club Nashville SC in exchange for up to $1.25 million in General Allocation Money and a 2020 international roster spot.

On February 29, 2020, Zimmerman scored the first goal in Nashville SC history.

On April 29, 2022, Nashville announced they had signed Zimmerman to a contract extension through 2025, and that it would also make him a Designated Player on their roster. The new contract made Zimmerman only the fourth American defender to be signed to a DP deal in league history.

International career 
On January 6, 2017, Zimmerman was called up for the first time to the United States national team by coach Bruce Arena. Zimmerman earned his first cap and start against Jamaica in a January Camp friendly on February 3, 2017. He was named player of the match. He scored his first goal (a header) on May 28, 2018, against Bolivia. In a 2022 World Cup match against Wales, Zimmerman tackled Gareth Bale, the Welsh attacker for penalty in the 82nd minute. Bale scored the penalty and tied the game. The game ended 1-1. According to ESPN, it was "a clumsy and unnecessary challenge".

Personal life
Zimmerman was born in Lawrenceville, Georgia, on May 19, 1993, to Becky and David Zimmerman. He has two older siblings.

Zimmerman is a Christian. Zimmerman is married to Sally Zimmerman. They have one child together.

Career statistics

Club

International 

Scores and results list the United States' goal tally first.

Honors 
FC Dallas
U.S. Open Cup: 2016
Supporters' Shield: 2016

Los Angeles FC
Supporters' Shield: 2019

United States
CONCACAF Gold Cup: 2021

Individual
MLS All-Star: 2019, 2021, 2022
MLS Best XI: 2019, 2020, 2021, 2022
MLS Defender of the Year: 2020, 2021

References

External links
 
 Furman bio

1993 births
Living people
People from Lawrenceville, Georgia
Sportspeople from the Atlanta metropolitan area
Soccer players from Georgia (U.S. state)
American soccer players
Association football central defenders
Furman Paladins men's soccer players
FC Dallas draft picks
FC Dallas players
Los Angeles FC players
Nashville SC players
Major League Soccer players
United States men's youth international soccer players
United States men's under-20 international soccer players
United States men's under-23 international soccer players
United States men's international soccer players
2019 CONCACAF Gold Cup players
2021 CONCACAF Gold Cup players
2022 FIFA World Cup players
American soccer coaches
UCLA Bruins men's soccer coaches
CONCACAF Gold Cup-winning players
Designated Players (MLS)